The Federation of Oceania Rugby Unions (FORU) section of the 2015 Rugby World Cup qualification involved five teams competing for one spot in the final tournament in England.

Format
In addition to four automatically qualified teams, Oceania was allocated one direct qualifying place (Oceania 1) for the 2015 Rugby World Cup to be held in England. It was the last region to begin its qualification process for 2015. The 2013 FORU Oceania Cup was the regional qualification tournament, with the winner playing Fiji in a one-off match for the qualifying place. The winner of this play-off qualified directly for Pool A of the 2015 Rugby World Cup as Oceania 1.

Entrants
The 2015 Rugby World Cup qualifying teams that competed for the 2015 Rugby World Cup – Oceania qualification. (World rankings, shown in brackets, are those immediately prior to first Oceania qualification match on 6 July 2012)
  (54)
  (14)
  (49)
  (70)
  (86)

Qualified nations
  (Automatic qualifier)
  (Automatic qualifier)
  (Automatic qualifier)
  (Automatic qualifier)
  (Oceania 1)

Round 1: Oceania Cup

The first round consisted of six home-and-away matches. The winner of the series proceeded to the second round. The FORU Oceania Cup took place in Papua New Guinea at the Lloyd Robson Oval in Port Moresby from 6 to 13 July.

Updated: 13 July 2013

Round 2: Oceania final
Fiji defeated the first round winner, Cook Islands, in a one-off match to determine who qualified for the 2015 Rugby World Cup.

References

External links
 Rugby World Cup Oceania qualification

2015
2015 Rugby World Cup qualification
World Cup
World Cup